Reciprocal teaching is an instructional activity that takes the form of a dialogue between teachers and students regarding segments of text for the purpose of constructing the meaning of text. Reciprocal teaching is a reading technique which is thought to promote students' reading comprehension.  A reciprocal approach provides students with four specific reading strategies that are actively and consciously used to support comprehension: Questioning, Clarifying, Summarizing, and Predicting. Palincsar (1986) believes the purpose of reciprocal teaching is to facilitate a group effort between teacher and students as well as among students in the task of bringing meaning to the text.

Reciprocal teaching is best represented as a dialogue between teachers and students in which participants take turns assuming the role of teacher. -Annemarie Sullivan Palincsar

Reciprocal teaching is most effective in the context of small-group collaborative investigation, which is maintained by the teacher or reading tutor.

Conceptual underpinnings 
The concept of reciprocal teaching was first developed by Annemarie Sullivan Palincsar and Ann L. Brown in 1984.
As previously mentioned, reciprocal teaching was developed as a technique to help teachers bridge the gap for students who demonstrated a discrepancy between decoding skills and comprehension skills (Palincsar, Ransom, & Derber, 1989). That is, the process is aimed at aiding students who possess grade-level skills in letter-sound correspondence ("sounding out" words and "chunking"), but are unable to construct meaning from the texts they decode. Reciprocal teaching utilizes the strategy of prediction, whereby students predict before reading, and then use those predictions during reading to check if they are correct (Stricklin, 2011). 

Reciprocal teaching is made up of four components: predicting, clarifying, questioning, and comprehension. In 2005, Oczkus coined the phrase the "fab four" to describe the processes involved with reciprocal teaching (Stricklin, 2011). Students then move on to clarifying things they do not understand by asking the instructor questions, or having the teacher ask questions during reading, in order to clarify difficult sections of text or point out areas where students should pay particular attention. After the text is read, questions are asked of a student or group of students to enhance retention and check how much was learned. Finally, comprehension is achieved by engaging the students in a summary of either a page or the entire text selection of what they just read (Stricklin, 2011). The teacher supports the students by rephrasing or elaborating on their answers, statements, and questions.

Role of reading strategies 
Reciprocal teaching is an amalgamation of reading strategies that effective readers are thought to use. As stated by Pilonieta and Medina in their article  "Reciprocal Teaching for the Primary Grades: We Can Do It, Too!", previous research conducted by Kincade and Beach (1996) indicates that proficient readers use specific comprehension strategies in their reading tasks, while poor readers do not (Pilonieta & Medina, 2009). Proficient readers have well-practiced decoding and comprehension skills which allow them to proceed through texts somewhat automatically until some sort of triggering event alerts them to a comprehension failure (Palincsar & Brown, 1984).

This trigger can be anything from an unacceptable accumulation of unknown concepts to an expectation that has not been fulfilled by the text. Whatever the trigger, proficient readers react to a comprehension breakdown by using a number of strategies in a planned, deliberate manner. These "fix-up" strategies range from simply slowing down the rate of reading or decoding, to re-reading, to consciously summarizing the material. Once the strategy (or strategies) has helped to restore meaning in the text, the successful reader can proceed again without conscious use of the strategy (Palincsar & Brown).

All readers—no matter how skilled—occasionally reach cognitive failure when reading texts that are challenging, unfamiliar, or "inconsiderate"—i.e. structured or written in an unusual manner (Garner, 1992; Wade, 2001).  Poor readers, on the other hand, do not demonstrate the same reaction when comprehension failure occurs. Some simply do not recognize the triggers that signal comprehension breakdown. Others are conscious that they do not understand the text, but do not have or are unable to employ strategies that help. Some use maladaptive strategies (such as avoidance) that do not aid in comprehension (Garner, 1992).  Mayer notes in his paper on Learning Strategies that reciprocal teaching can help even novice learners become more adept at utilizing learning strategies and furthering their understanding of a subject (1996). Mayer also notes that the reciprocal teaching process gives the students the chance to learn more by having the teachers as role models, and that the reciprocal teaching process gives beginners in an academic field a chance to learn from the experts by taking turns leading the class (Mayer, 1996).

Strategies 
Approaching the problem from the perspective of Cognitive Strategy Instruction (Slater & Horstman, 2002), reciprocal teaching attempts to train students in specific and discrete strategies to prevent cognitive failure during reading. Palincsar and Brown (1984) identified four basic strategies that may help students recognize and react to signs of comprehension breakdown: Questioning, Clarifying, Summarizing, and Predicting. These strategies serve dual purposes of being both comprehension-fostering and comprehension-monitoring; that is, they are thought to enhance comprehension while at the same time affording students the opportunity to check whether it is occurring. The leader follows these four steps in this specific order:

Predicting 
The prediction phase involves readers in actively combining their own background knowledge with what they have gathered from the text. With a narrative text students imagine what might happen next. With an informational text, students predict what they might learn or read about in subsequent passages.

Predicting involves combining the reader's prior knowledge, new knowledge from the text, and the text's structure to create hypotheses related to the direction of the text and the author's intent in writing. Predicting provides an overall rationale for reading – to confirm or disconfirm self-generated hypotheses (Doolittle et al., 2006).

The Predictor can offer predictions about what the author will tell the group next or, if it is a literary selection, the predictor might suggest what the next events in the story will be. As Williams points out, predictions do not necessarily need to be accurate, but they need to be clear (2011). 

The sequence of reading, questioning, clarifying, summarizing, and predicting is then repeated with subsequent sections of text.
Different reading strategies have been incorporated into the reciprocal teaching format by other practitioners. Some other reading strategies include visualizing, making connections, inferencing, and questioning the author.

Questioning 
When using the questioning strategy, readers monitor and assess their own understanding of the text by asking themselves questions. This self-awareness of one's own internal thought process is termed "metacognition".

Questioning involves the identification of information, themes, and ideas that are central and important enough to warrant further consideration. The central or important information, themes, or ideas are used to generate questions that are then used as self-tests for the reader. Questioning provides a context for exploring the text more deeply and assuring the construction of meaning (Doolittle, Hicks, Triplett, Nichols, & Young, 2006)

The Questioner will pose questions about the selection:
 Unclear parts
 Puzzling information
 Connections to other concepts already learned

Clarifying 
The clarification strategy focuses on training students in specific steps to help with decoding (letter-sound correspondence, "chunking", spelling, etc.), as well as fix-up strategies to deal with difficult vocabulary and lapses in concentration.

Clarifying involves the identification and clarification of unclear, difficult, or unfamiliar aspects of a text. These aspects may include awkward sentence or passage structure, unfamiliar vocabulary, unclear references, or obscure concepts. Clarifying provides the motivation to remediate confusion through re-reading, the use of context in which the text was written and/or read, and the use of external resources (e.g., dictionary or thesaurus) (Doolittle et al., 2006).

The Clarifier will address confusing parts and attempt to answer the questions that were just posed.

Summarizing 
Summarization requires the reader to perform the task of discriminating between important and less-important information in the text. It must then be organized into a coherent whole (Palincsar & Brown, 1984).

Summarizing is the process of identifying the important information, themes, and ideas within a text and integrating these into a clear and concise statement that communicates the essential meaning of the text. Summarizing may be based on a single paragraph, a section of text, or an entire passage. Summarizing provides the impetus to create a context for understanding the specifics of a text (Doolittle et al., 2006).

The Summarizer will use his/her own words to tell the main idea of the text. This can happen anywhere in the story, and it should happen often for those students who are at-risk. It can happen first at sentence level, then paragraphs, then to whole text.

Instructional format 
Reciprocal teaching follows a dialogic/dialectic process. Palincsar, Ransom, and Derber (1989) wrote that there were two reasons for choosing dialogue as the medium. First, it is a language format with which children are familiar (as opposed to writing, which may be too difficult for some struggling readers). Second, dialogue provides a useful vehicle for alternating control between teacher and students in a systematic and purposeful manner.

Reciprocal teaching illustrates a number of unique ideas for teaching and learning and is based on both developmental and cognitive theories.  The strategies embedded in reciprocal teaching represent those that successful learners engage in while interacting with text.  They are thought to encourage self-regulation and self-monitoring and promote intentional learning (Brown, 1980).

Reciprocal teaching also follows a very scaffolded curve, beginning with high levels of teacher instruction, modeling, and input, which is gradually withdrawn to the point that students are able to use the strategies independently. Reciprocal teaching begins with the students and teacher reading a short piece of text together. In the beginning stages, the teacher models the "Fab Four" strategies required by reciprocal teaching, and teacher and students share in conversation to come to a mutual agreement about the text (Williams, 2011). The teacher then specifically and explicitly models his or her thinking processes out loud, using each of the four reading strategies. Students follow the teacher's model with their own strategies, also verbalizing their thought processes for the other students to hear.

Over time, the teacher models less and less frequently as students become more adept and confident with the strategies. Eventually, responsibility for leading the small-group discussions of the text and the strategies is handed over to the students. This gives the teacher or reading tutor the opportunity to diagnose strengths, weaknesses, misconceptions, and to provide follow-up as needed.

Reciprocal teaching encompasses several techniques involving the who, what, and where, of learning (Mayer, 475-476):
 What is learned are cognitive strategies for reading comprehension rather than specific facts and procedures. The teaching focuses on how to learn rather than what to learn.
 Learning of the cognitive strategies occurs within real reading comprehension tasks rather than having each strategy taught in isolation. Learning takes place in an order, rather than learning everything separately.
 Students learn as apprentices within a cooperative learning group that is working together on a task. The students are learning through themselves, and through the others in their group.

Current uses 
The reciprocal teaching model has been in use for the past 20 years (Williams, 2011) and has been adopted by a number of school districts and reading intervention programs across the United States and Canada. It has also been used as the model for a number of commercially produced reading programs such as Soar to Success, Connectors, Into Connectors. Unfortunately, according to Williams, most students and teachers in this country have "never even heard of it" (2011).  Available from Global Ed in New Zealand, written by Jill Eggleton is the Connectors and Into Connectors Series.  These two series have both non fiction and fiction text. (2015) Abrams Learning Trends publishers Key Links Peer Readers by Jill Eggleton (2016)

Reciprocal teaching is also being adopted and researched in countries other than the United States. For example, Yu-Fen Yang of Taiwan conducted a study to develop a reciprocal teaching/learning strategy in remedial English reading classes (2010). Yang's study concluded that 
"...students expressed that they observed and learned from the teacher’s or their peers’ externalization of strategy usage. Students’ reading progress in the remedial instruction incorporating the RT system was also identified by the pre- and post-tests. This study suggests that there may be benefits for teachers in encouraging students to interact with others in order to clarify and discuss comprehension questions and constantly monitor and regulate their own reading" (2010).

In a 2008 study presented effective implementation of reciprocal teaching to students diagnosed with mild to moderate forms of disability. Within this group, ten percent of students had difficulty in learning due to Down Syndrome. The average of the participants was around eighteen years of age. The researchers, Miriam Alfassi, Itzhak Weiss, and Hefziba Lifshitz, developed a study based on Palincsar and Brown's design of reciprocal teaching for students who were considered academically too low for the complex skills of reading comprehension. The study compared two styles of teaching, remediation/direct instruction to Palincsar/Brown reciprocal teaching. After twelve weeks of instruction and assessments, reciprocal teaching was found to produce a greater success rate in improving the literacy skills in the participants with mild to moderate learning disabilities. After the study was completed, researchers recommended reciprocal teaching so that students are taught in an interactive environment that includes meaningful and connected texts. This research for the European Journal of Special Needs Education, promotes reciprocal teaching for its structure in dialogues and how students learn to apply those dialogues based on the reading taking place in instruction.

Currently in the United States research has also been conducted on the use of reciprocal teaching in primary grades. Pilonieta and Medina conducted a series of procedures to implement their version of reciprocal teaching in elementary school students (2009). The researchers adopted an age-appropriate model for reciprocal teaching and called it "Reciprocal Teaching for the Primary Grades", or RTPG (2009). Their research shows that even in younger children, reciprocal teaching apparently benefited the students and they showed retention of the RTPG when re-tested six months later (2009).

Reciprocal teaching has been heralded as effective in helping students improve their reading ability in pre-post trials or research studies (Pearson & Doyle, 1987; Pressley et al., 1987) Further trials employing Reciprocal Teaching have consistently indicated the technique promotes reading comprehension as measured on standardized reading tests (Carter, 1997).

Vygotsky connection 
In "Thought and Language" Lev Vygotsky limns the profound connection between (oral) language,cognition and learning. Refer to Learning by Teaching for additional evidence. The intensive oral language component in Reciprocal Teaching is Vygotskian.

Reciprocal Teaching is a contemporary application of Vygotsky's theories; it is used to improve students' ability to learn from text.  In this method, teacher and students collaborate in learning and practicing four key skills: summarizing, questioning, clarifying, and predicting.  The teacher's role in the process is reduced over time.  Also, reciprocal teaching is relevant to instructional concepts such as "scaffolding" and "apprenticeship", in which a teacher or more advanced peer helps to structure or arrange a task so that a novice can work on it successfully.

The design of this instructional method was influenced primarily by the work of Vygotsky and his notion of a "zone of proximal development", which he characterized as "the distance between the actual developmental level as determined by independent problem solving and the level of potential development as determined through problem solving under adult guidance, or in collaboration with more capable peers" (Vygotsky, 1978, p. 86).  The assistance provided the learner is a good example of scaffolding in that both temporary and adjusted support is provided, according to the needs of the participants.  The assistance is withdrawn when it is no longer needed.  The sequence of teacher modeling, coaching, and then fading also provides an excellent example of the structure of a cognitive apprenticeship as outlined by Collins, Brown, and Newman (1989).

References

Mayer, R.E. (1996). Learning Strategies for Making Sense out of Expository Text: The SOI Model for Guiding Three Cognitive Processes in Knowledge Construction. Educational Psychology Review 8(4) 357-371.

External links 
 Palincsar & Brown: Reciprocal Teaching of Comprehension-Fostering and Comprehension-Monitoring Activities
 http://www.readingrockets.org/strategies/reciprocal_teaching/
 http://www.powershow.com/view/1cda1-MjYyO/Reciprocal_Teaching_Teaching_Cognitive_Strategies_In_Context_Through_Dialogue_To_Enhance_Comprehen_flash_ppt_presentation

Learning methods
Learning to read
Reading (process)
Special education
Pedagogy